Farnell Valley is an ice-free valley,  long, a tributary to Beacon Valley, descending to the latter from the southeast side, in Victoria Land, Antarctica. It was named by the Advisory Committee on Antarctic Names in 1964 for James B.H. Farnell, who assisted in supplying field parties at McMurdo Station in 1960.

References 

Valleys of Victoria Land
Scott Coast